Brittin is a surname. Notable people with the surname include:

Dingley Askham Brittin (1823–1881), English solicitor
Jack Brittin (1924–1994), American baseball player
Jan Brittin (born 1959), English cricketer
Matt Brittin (born 1968), British businessman
Nelson V. Brittin (1920–1951), American soldier